Souillac is a railway station in Souillac, Occitanie, France. The station opened in 1889 and is on the Orléans–Montauban railway line. The station is served by Intercités de nuit (night train), Téoz (Intercity) and TER (local) services.

Train services
The following services currently call at Souillac:
intercity services (Intercités) Paris–Vierzon–Limoges–Toulouse
night services (Intercités de nuit) Paris–Orléans–Souillac–Toulouse
local service (TER Occitanie) Brive-la-Gaillarde–Cahors–Montauban–Toulouse

References

Railway stations in Lot (department)
Railway stations in France opened in 1889